"The Bringers of Wonder, Part One" is the seventeenth episode of the second series of Space: 1999 (and the forty-first overall episode of the programme).  The screenplay was written by Terence Feely; the director was Tom Clegg.  The final shooting script is dated 23 June 1976.  Live-action filming took place Wednesday 25 August 1976 through Tuesday 28 September 1976 (with a two-day interruption on 21 and 22 September to film additional material for "The Beta Cloud").  A day of second-unit filming was completed on Tuesday 30 November 1976  This was the series' only two-part episode.

Story
It is 1912 days after leaving Earth orbit, and the routine in Command Centre is suddenly interrupted by a series of whoops and exclamations from the speakers.  John Koenig had been out on a reconnaissance flight to investigate a localised increase in the neutron count.  Now, he is behaving like a drunken adolescent out for a joyride, taking Eagle Ten through a series of dare-devil manoeuvres.  Loops and barrel-rolls soon give way to death-defying dives on the Alpha complex.  Soon bored with this game, Koenig takes off across the lunar surface to begin buzzing about the nuclear waste domes.

Alan Carter tries to establish a remote link with the ship and discovers its controls are set on manual.  As the three domes store the atomic waste from Moonbase Alpha's reactors, Tony Verdeschi is concerned an impact could generate a nuclear explosion.  Maya assures him that only the introduction of atomic fuel could instigate such an act.  If the Commander's reckless behaviour continues, a crash is inevitable; Verdeschi orders Carter to take nuclear physicists Jack Bartlett and Joe Ehrlich with him on the rescue pod-equipped Eagle.

Koenig pilots his ship in a crash-dive down into the nearest dome.  As alarms sound, he comes out of his euphoric state, but not in time to avoid a collision.  Trying to level out, he clips a dome with a fuel pod and the Eagle ploughs out of control across the Moon's surface.  Koenig manages to put on his space helmet and seal his suit before losing consciousness.  Fuel from the ruptured tank ignites and an inferno rages inside the ship.  Carter lands at the crash site and rescue workers board the burning Eagle, pulling Koenig to safety in the nick of time.

Koenig is rushed back to Alpha.  He has severe concussion; Doctor Helena Russell feels his condition is serious enough to warrant using the Ellendorf quadrographic brain complex, an instrument which takes brain impulses, modifies them electronically and feeds them back into the brain—in essence, a cerebral 'massage'.  The device is experimental, but in her professional judgment it was Koenig's only chance of not slipping into deep coma.  If all goes well, he should be conscious when the treatment concludes in fifteen minutes.  Verdeschi is called away when long-range sensors pick up an approaching space vessel.

Verdeschi wants to confer with Koenig, but the treatment is not complete.  Currently at a distance of over 90 million miles distant, Maya states that, even moving at the speed of light, the ship could not arrive before then.  However, it is travelling faster than light and is upon them in minutes.  Verdeschi calls for a visual; the ship is an impressive—and familiar—design.  It is a Superswift, an Earth ship designed for interstellar travel.  The project was shelved by the World Space Commission as no one could devise a practical faster-than-light propulsion system—at least as of September 1999.  Tracked by Alpha's laser batteries, the ship comes in for a landing.  Contact is made and the visual of its captain shocks Verdeschi—it is his older brother, Guido.

The staff gathers at the travel-tube reception area to greet their rescuers.  In addition to the Verdeschi brothers' reunion, Helena embraces Doctor Shaw, her mentor from medical school.  Carter welcomes his best mate, astronaut Ken Burdett, while Sandra Benes rushes into the arms of her fiancé, pilot Peter Rockwell.  Ehrlich trades golf handicaps with his cousin Henry and Bartlett greets his friendly rival, physicist Professor Hunter.  As Diana Morris, an old flame of Koenig's (and notorious man-eater) searches the crowd for the Commander, Carter tries to chat up Louisa, who turns out to be Doctor Ben Vincent's fiancée.  The guests put off the Alphans' questions until later and a proper party ensues.

Verdeschi introduces Maya to Guido and the brothers engage in a game of verbal one-upmanship.  Englishman Bartlett swells with pride when he hears the transluminal drive was developed by researchers at Cambridge—but is disappointed when Hunter the American smugly reveals it was Cambridge, Massachusetts.  A development of the ion rocket, it can make loops in the space-time continuum; travel time back to Earth, subjectively, is a matter of hours.  Guido tells them the Superswift is the advance party; Earth will dispatch proper transport ships to evacuate Moonbase Alpha.  At this, Maya withdraws, insecure with the thought of becoming an outsider among Earth's billions.

Hunter and Rockwell slip away from the party and proceed to the Medical Section.  They encounter an orderly, Sandstrom, who suddenly stops in his tracks as if mesmerised by their stares.  The man proceeds to the care unit and approaches the brain complex.  As he alters its settings, the unconscious Koenig squirms in discomfort.

At the party, Helena is trapped into a conversation with the haughty Diana, who opens with a series of catty remarks.  When the topic turns to the doctor's relationship with Koenig, Helena gives as good as she gets.  Across the room, Vincent is showing Louisa one of the remote medical relays which allow them to monitor patients from anywhere on the base.  He observes Koenig's obvious distress, but Louisa stares into his eyes and he, in a trance-like state, switches off the monitor.  When the girl is swept away by Carter, Vincent's head clears.  Reactivating the screen, he observes Koenig's condition and dashes from the room.

Koenig is convulsing by the time Vincent reaches Medical.  He throws the orderly away from the brain complex, but the man attacks him with manic intensity.  A brawl ensues, and the madman is rendered unconscious with a choke-hold.  Helena enters in time to sedate the murderous Sandstrom as he recovers and lunges for the helpless patient.  The two doctors examine Koenig; fortunately, the treatment cycle had ended and there is no sign of complications.  After a few moments, Koenig regains consciousness.  Remembering nothing of his wild ride, he questions the cause of the crash and is dismayed to learn it was pilot error.

As he frets over his bout of irrational behaviour, Helena consoles him by relating the arrival of the Superswift.  Koenig first thinks she is joking, especially at the mention of the space programme's resident barracuda, Diana Morris.  He soon realises she is serious and jumps up and kisses her in celebration.  They stroll arm in arm to join the party, but when Koenig catches sight of the Earth visitors, he reacts violently, perceiving them as grotesque alien monsters.  The men try to restrain him, but he resists and Helena is forced to stun him into submission.

Koenig is taken back to the care unit and placed in restraints.  He is agitated, muttering, trying to formulate a plan of action even though unconscious.  When he comes to, Helena and Verdeschi try to convince him that what he sees as aliens are really people from Earth.  Helena has brought Shaw to consult on the case, but as he approaches, Koenig psychotically screams for them to get 'that thing' away from him.  The more Koenig pleads to be released, the more agitated he becomes and Helena sedates him.  Verdeschi wonders if the Ellendorf apparatus could have aggravated his earlier mental instability.

Shaw returns to Command Centre and upbraids Louisa; if she had not lost control of Vincent, Koenig would be dead.  She asks why fear him when they could just arrange to control him.  Shaw states that something has interfered with their ability to control his mind.  The doctor is then summoned to the records office.  Guido stands outside a glass partition, watching records clerk Clive Kander; the man's mind is resisting him and he requires help.  Kander is reviewing recordings of recent events, and when he plays the video of the Earth party's arrival, he reacts with horror...then slips under the mental control of the 'Earth men'.

Mesmerised, Kander locks and jams the door, turns the emergency oxygen supply full on, and wrecks the video player.  A passing woman also witnesses this act and calls in the emergency.  By the time the senior staff are present, Kander is a raving lunatic and tearing the room apart.  The rescue team can neither unjam the door nor blast it open with lasers without igniting the oxygen.  Maya transforms into a beetle, crawls through the air-vent, and enters the room.  Reverting to normal, the metamorph tries to open the lock, but is attacked by Kander.  In self-defence, she changes into an alien animal.

Kander recoils and smashes into the commlock panel, shorting it out; the sparks ignite the oxygen and the room is engulfed in flame.  Maya escapes unharmed, but Kander is set ablaze and dies from the burns...the secret of what he saw dying with him.  As emergency teams fight the fire, Shaw and Guido take Verdeschi aside.  The matter of their return home must be addressed; the Moon's errant trajectory will soon carry them out of range.  A three-man pilot ship (also equipped with the light-speed drive) will fly back to Earth and they ask Verdeschi to select an Alphan crew.  He draws names at random, but under Guido's influence, he believes Carter, Bartlett and Ehrlich's are those chosen.

As preparations for the flight proceed, Koenig comes around.  At first, he appears normal and rational.  Conversing with Helena and Verdeschi, he tries to convince them their Earth friends are in fact hostile, hideous aliens.  The pair refuse to listen, blithely dismissing every suspicion or inconsistency he cites.  Faced with failure, the Commander becomes agitated.  The announcement of the pilot ship's readiness to launch leads to a more aggressive outburst, and Helena once again sedates him.

The three ecstatic selectees depart and, within a few hours, are in sight of Earth.  All Alpha celebrates the end of their incarceration on the runaway Moon.  Verdeschi and Maya take a recording of the pilot ship's broadcasts to convince Koenig of the true situation, but are ambushed by Sandstrom (who had been freed earlier by Professor Hunter).  As Verdeschi goes down, Maya transforms into a Kendo warrior and beats the madman into submission with a bamboo shinai.

During this, the being known as 'Doctor Shaw' enters the care unit.  Helena has asked him to examine the unconscious Koenig and see what he can make of his perplexing condition.  As he approaches, Koenig awakens and, as before, sees the alien in its true form squelching across the floor—a seven-foot-tall, slime-covered, pulsating heap of protoplasm resembling a Portuguese man o' war standing erect on its tentacles.  He struggles against the restraints as the alien flops across his body and begins to smother the life out of him...

Cast

Starring 
 Martin Landau — Commander John Koenig
 Barbara Bain — Doctor Helena Russell

Also starring 
 Catherine Schell — Maya

Featuring 
 Tony Anholt — Tony Verdeschi
 Nick Tate — Captain Alan Carter
 Zienia Merton — Sandra Benes
 Jeffery Kissoon — Doctor Ben Vincent

Guest stars 
 Toby Robins — Diana Morris
 Stuart Damon — Captain Guido Verdeschi
 Jeremy Young — Jack Bartlett
 Drewe Henley — Joe Ehrlich
 Patrick Westwood — Doctor Shaw
 Cher Cameron — Louisa

Also featuring 
 Al Lampert — Ken Burdett
 Billy J. Mitchell — Professor Hunter
 Earl Robinson — Sandstrom
 Nicholas Young — Peter Rockwell
 Robert Sheedy - Henry
 Albin Pahernik — Maya/Lizard Animal (Command Centre)

Uncredited artists 
 Nick Hobbs — Clive Kander
 Glenda Allen — Female Operative
 Robert Reeves — Peter
 Jenny Cresswell — Command Centre Operative
 Okimitsu Fujii — Maya/Kendo Warrior
 Roy Scammell — Maya/Alien Animal (Records Lab)

Music 
The score was re-edited from previous Space: 1999 incidental music tracks composed for the second series by Derek Wadsworth and draws primarily from the scores of "The Metamorph" and "Space Warp".

Production notes 
  On the strength of his first script, "New Adam, New Eve", Gerry Anderson and Fred Freiberger commissioned a second submission from writer Terence Feely.  Pleased with his treatment (entitled "The Globs"), the decision was made to expand the story into a two-part episode.  Freiberger planned these episodes to have the same grand scale achieved by the first series on his limited budget.  Amortizing costs over two segments allowed for a large guest cast and more expansive sets.  During live-action shooting, Feely went away on holiday for a month.  On his return, he was unhappy to learn that Freiberger had heavily re-written his scripts.  The change he most objected to involved the early revelation of the aliens.  In his version, he had hidden their true appearance until the final scenes of part one, when the 'Doctor Shaw' jelly being moves in to kill Koenig.  He had wanted the audience to believe Koenig really might be insane.
  A character moment for Helena was cut for time in which she reminisces with Doctor Shaw how the first patient she lost was her father, who had died of a massive heart attack in their home while she was still in medical school.  The epilogue scene where Maya and Verdeschi were attacked by Sandstrom was altered for budgetary and logistical reasons.  In the 23 June 1976 draft, Maya would transform into a python to subdue the crazed orderly; by 24 August 1976, amendments had Maya changing into a Kendo warrior instead.
  Attentive viewers will recognise actor Stuart Damon from his previous appearance in the first-series episode "Matter of Life and Death", where he played Parks, the unfortunate survey-mission pilot.  Costumes, props and sets re-used in this episode include: (1) The blue lizard animal Maya transforms into when angered by Diana Morris was a re-painted version of the Kreno animal, previously seen in "The AB Chrysalis" and "The Beta Cloud"; (2) The Ellendorf brain-complex prop was a re-vamped version of the Dorfman artificial-heart test machine from "Catacombs of the Moon"; (3)  The nuclear-waste domes were cannibalised from the spherical towers seen in "The AB Chrysalis"; (4) The interior of the pilot ship was originally seen in the earlier Gerry and Sylvia Anderson production UFO as various ShadAir transport planes.

Novelisation 
The episode was adapted in the fourth Year Two Space: 1999 novel The Psychomorph by Michael Butterworth, published in 1977.  The author would make the jelly aliens the psychically-synthesised minions of a massive non-corporeal space amoeba (which was also the unseen antagonist in the previous segment "The Lambda Factor").  The sentient amoeba was dying and required a massive influx of radiation to rejuvenate itself.  It would manipulate the Alphans with the lambda-wave effect to provide the explosion that would be its salvation.

References

External links 
Space: 1999 - "The Bringers of Wonder, Part One" - The Catacombs episode guide
Space: 1999 - "The Bringers of Wonder, Part One" - Moonbase Alpha's Space: 1999 page

1977 British television episodes
Space: 1999 episodes